Stenomordella longeantennalis is a species of beetle in the genus Stenomordella of the family Mordellidae. It was described in 1941.

References

Mordellidae
Beetles described in 1941